Salvador Cardona Balbastre (12 January 1901 - 15 January 1985) was a Spanish professional road racing cyclist from Alfauir. In 1929 he became the first Spanish road bicycle racer to win a stage in Tour de France.

Major results

1929
4th, Overall, Tour de France
1st, Stage 9
1st, Overall, Vuelta a Levante
1931
1st, Overall, Volta a Catalunya
1933
1st, Prueba Villafranca de Ordizia
1st, Overall, Tour of Galicia
1935
 National Road Cycling Championship
1st, Stage 6 & 7, Volta a Catalunya
1st, Stage 9, Vuelta a España
1st, Overall, Vuelta a Mallorca
1936
1st, Stage 9, Vuelta a España

External links

Results in Tour de France for Salvador CARDONA BALBASTRE
Article about Salvador Cardona 

Spanish male cyclists
1901 births
1985 deaths
Spanish Tour de France stage winners
Spanish Vuelta a España stage winners
People from Safor
Sportspeople from the Province of Valencia
Cyclists from the Valencian Community